The  Coco River is a river in Sabana Grande in Puerto Rico.

References

External links
 USGS Hydrologic Unit Map – Caribbean Region (1974)

Rivers of Puerto Rico